Chris Tuchscherer (born September 8, 1975) is a retired American mixed martial artist who last competed as a Heavyweight for the Ultimate Fighting Championship.

Background
Born in Rugby, North Dakota, Tuchscherer competed in wrestling for Bowman County High School, continuing with the sport at North Dakota State before eventually transferring to NCAA Division II Minnesota State University, Moorhead. At MSUM Tuchscherer participated in Heavyweight NCAA Division II competitions and became a two-time All-American as well as an NCAA Division II Championship Runner-Up.

Mixed martial arts career

Early career
After using up all of his college eligibility, Tuchscherer - who was already a fan of MMA - was urged by his friends to try competing himself. He tried out for and earned a spot on a local fight card where he won his first amateur match in less than a minute. Tuchscherer continued training at MSUM while helping to coach the university's wrestling team.  He later began training at Minnesota Martial Arts Academy with fellow All-American Brock Lesnar. 

In his first professional MMA bout Tuchscherer defeated Krzysztof Soszynski by decision. Later in his career, he won the Dakota Fighting Championships Heavyweight Championship, and at Extreme Challenge 85 on October 6, 2007, Tuchscherer defeated Jimmy Ambriz for the EC Heavyweight Championship.  He later participated at YAMMA Pit Fighting's only event in a heavyweight tournament where he defeated both Tony Sylvester and Alexey Oleinik by unanimous decision before losing by unanimous decision in the final to Travis Wiuff. Tuchscherer then won the Max Fights Heavyweight Championship on July 19, 2008, by defeating Tony Mendoza at Max Fights 4 before defeating Branden Lee Hinkle on March 21, 2009, at "Beatdown 4" to win the first SNMAA heavyweight championship.

Ultimate Fighting Championship
Chris Tuchscherer tried out for the tenth season of the Ultimate Fighting Championship's (UFC) reality show, The Ultimate Fighter.  The UFC scouts at the tryouts noticed Tuchscherer's professional record and decided to give him a fight at a UFC event rather than go through the show's tournament.  As a result, Tuchscherer debuted with the UFC at UFC 102 against Gabriel Gonzaga.  Early in their fight Tuchscherer was hit with a hard kick to his groin by Gonzaga.  Tuchscherer required several minutes to recover during which he nearly vomited.  He managed to convince a group of officials that he was willing and able to continue in the fight.  Following the restart of the match, Tuchscherer lost to Gonzaga by technical knockout at 2:27 of the first round.

His next fight was with Tim Hague who was coming off being the subject of the UFC's fastest knockout.  Occurring on February 6, 2010 at UFC 109, Tuchscherer was once again faced with being on the receiving end of a low blow early in the first round. He managed to continue this time. However, conditioning for both fighters seemed to be poor as the action throughout the match was sporadic and they were visibly exhausted in the third round. Tuchscherer won the fight by majority decision (29–28, 29–28, and 28–28).

On July 3, 2010, at UFC 116, Tuchscherer faced Brendan Schaub. Tuchscherer lost the fight by TKO in the first round. 

Tuchscherer's next bout was against Mark Hunt on February 27, 2011 at UFC 127. Tuchscherer suffered his second consecutive loss when Hunt knocked him out at 1:41 into the second round. 

Following his loss to Hunt, Tuchscherer was released from the UFC.

Crowbar MMA
Chris Tuchscherer ran his own promotion, "Crowbar MMA", that held five events in Fargo, North Dakota and Grand Forks, North Dakota.

Personal life
Tuchscherer and his wife have a daughter and a son. Before becoming a professional fighter, Tuchscherer worked as a plumber.

Mixed martial arts record

|-
|Loss
|align=center|21–4 (1)
| Mark Hunt
|KO (punch)
|UFC 127
|
|align=center|2
|align=center|1:41
|Sydney, Australia
|
|-
|Loss
|align=center|21–3 (1)
| Brendan Schaub
|TKO (punches)
|UFC 116
|
|align=center|1
|align=center|1:07
|Las Vegas, Nevada, United States
|
|-
| Win
|align=center|21–2 (1)
| Tim Hague
|Decision (majority)
|UFC 109
|
|align=center|3
|align=center|5:00
|Las Vegas, Nevada, United States
|
|-
| Loss
|align=center|20–2 (1)
| Gabriel Gonzaga
|TKO (punches)
|UFC 102
|
|align=center|1
|align=center|2:27
|Portland, Oregon, United States
|
|-
| Win
|align=center|20–1 (1)
| Jamie Klair
|TKO (punches)
|SNMMA: Extreme Beatdown
|
|align=center|1
|align=center|2:19
|Phoenix, Arizona, United States
|Defended SNMAA Heavyweight Championship.
|-
| Win
|align=center|19–1 (1)
| Branden Lee Hinkle 
|TKO (punches)
|SNMMA: Beatdown at 4 Bears
|
|align=center|4
|align=center|4:43
|New Town, North Dakota, United States
|Won SNMAA Heavyweight Championship.
|-
| Win
|align=center|18–1 (1)
| Tony Mendoza
|Submission (armbar)
|Max Fights 4
|
|align=center|1
|align=center|2:43
|North Dakota, United States
|Won Max Fights Heavyweight Championship.
|-
| Loss
|align=center|17–1 (1)
| Travis Wiuff
|Decision (unanimous)
|YAMMA Pit Fighting
|
|align=center|3
|align=center|5:00
|Atlantic City, New Jersey, United States
|Finals of YAMMA Heavyweight Tournament.
|-
| Win
|align=center|17–0 (1)
| Oleksiy Oliynyk
|Decision (unanimous)
|YAMMA Pit Fighting
|
|align=center|1
|align=center|5:00
|Atlantic City, New Jersey, United States
|
|-
| Win
|align=center|16–0 (1)
| Tony Sylvester
|Decision (unanimous)
|YAMMA Pit Fighting
|
|align=center|1
|align=center|5:00
|Atlantic City, New Jersey, United States
|
|-
| Win
|align=center|15–0 (1)
| Travis Fulton
|Decision (unanimous)
|Max Fights 2
|
|align=center|3
|align=center|5:00
|Fargo, North Dakota, United States
|
|-
| Win
|align=center|14–0 (1)
| Jimmy Ambriz
|Submission (rear-naked choke)
|Extreme Challenge 85
|
|align=center|1
|align=center|4:43
|Bismarck, North Dakota, United States
|Won EC Heavyweight Championship.
|-
| Win
|align=center|13–0 (1)
| Matt Eckerle
|TKO (punches)
|DFC 9: Dakota vs. the World
|
|align=center|1
|align=center|2:17
|Grand Forks, North Dakota, United States
|
|-
| Win
|align=center|12–0 (1)
| Chuck Grigsby
|TKO (punches)
|DFC 8: Proving Grounds
|
|align=center|1
|align=center|3:49
|Fargo, North Dakota, United States
|
|-
| Win
|align=center|11–0 (1)
| Demian Decorah
|TKO (punches)
|DFC 7: Revolution
|
|align=center|1
|align=center|4:24
|Bismarck, North Dakota, United States
|
|-
| NC
|align=center|10–0 (1)
| Josh Hendricks
|NC (overturned)
|Fightfest 2
|
|align=center|1
|align=center|N/A
|Canton, Ohio, United States
|
|-
| Win
|align=center|10–0
| Ed Myers
|TKO (punches)
|Royce Gracie Fightfest 1
|
|align=center|1
|align=center|1:05
|Evansville, Indiana, United States
|
|-
| Win
|align=center|9–0
| Jim Dobson
|TKO (punches)
|DFC 5: Legends of the Falls
|
|align=center|1
|align=center|0:55
|Thief River Falls, Minnesota, United States
|
|-
| Win
|align=center|8–0
| Matt Lafromboise
|TKO (submission to punches)
|NFA: Last Dam Fights
|
|align=center|1
|align=center|1:44
|Fargo, North Dakota, United States
|
|-
| Win
|align=center|7–0
| Chris Clark
|TKO (submission to punches)
|DFC 4: Nowhere to Run
|
|align=center|1
|align=center|1:06
|Fargo, North Dakota, United States
|
|-
| Win
|align=center|6–0
| Jason Miller
|TKO (submission to punches)
|NFA: Throwdown in Jamestown 2
|
|align=center|1
|align=center|0:18
|Fargo, North Dakota, United States
|
|-
| Win
|align=center|5–0
| Karl Knothe
|Submission (rear-naked choke)
|Cage Fighting Xtreme 3
|
|align=center|2
|align=center|N/A
|Brainerd, Minnesota, United States
|
|-
| Win
|align=center|4–0
| Marc Zee
|TKO (punches)
|DFC 3: Submission Impossible
|
|align=center|1
|align=center|2:25
|Fargo, North Dakota, United States
|
|-
| Win
|align=center|3–0
| Noah Inhofer
|TKO (punches)
|DFC 2: Reloaded
|
|align=center|1
|align=center|2:02
|Fargo, North Dakota, United States
|
|-
| Win
|align=center|2–0
| Krzysztof Soszynski
|Decision (unanimous)
|NFA: Title Trials
|
|align=center|3
|align=center|3:00
|Moorhead, Minnesota, United States
|
|-
| Win
|align=center|1–0
| Sean Cooke
|Submission (choke)
|Dakota Fighting Championships 1
|
|align=center|1
|align=center|0:28
|Fargo, North Dakota, United States
|

See also
 List of current UFC fighters
 List of male mixed martial artists

References

External links
 
 

1975 births
Living people
People from Rugby, North Dakota
American male mixed martial artists
Heavyweight mixed martial artists
Mixed martial artists utilizing collegiate wrestling
American male sport wrestlers
Minnesota State–Moorhead Dragons wrestlers
Mixed martial artists from North Dakota
Ultimate Fighting Championship male fighters